Pam Marshall (born August 16, 1960) is a retired American sprinter. She won a gold medal in the sprint relay and finished fourth in the 200m final at the 1987 World Championships. She won the 200m at the 1986 Goodwill Games and was a three-time US champion. Her 200m best of 21.93 secs in 1988, ranked her 10th on the world all-time list at that time, and (as of 2021) still ranks her in the all-time top 30.

Career
Marshall competed in the 100 m, 200 m and 4 × 100 m Relay. Her best result was anchoring the U.S 4 × 100 m relay team to the gold medal at the 1987 World Championships Rome Italy, in a time of 41.58 CR which still ranks as one of the fastest times ever.

She clocked an impressive 10.11 for her final 100 m which saw her bring the team home almost half a second ahead of the GDR team anchored by Marlies Göhr (10.41 secs). Pam came 8th in the 100 m and fourth in the 200 m at the same Championship.

She went on to make the USA Olympic team over 200 m the following season, however due to injury did not get past the preliminary rounds.

Competition record

Personal bests

References

External sources 
The International Track and Field Annual '88/9 Simon & Schuster 

1960 births
Living people
American female sprinters
World Athletics Championships athletes for the United States
World Athletics Championships medalists
Athletes (track and field) at the 1988 Summer Olympics
Olympic track and field athletes of the United States
Goodwill Games medalists in athletics
USA Outdoor Track and Field Championships winners
World Athletics Championships winners
Competitors at the 1986 Goodwill Games
Olympic female sprinters
21st-century American women